Port Afrique is a 1956 British drama film based on the 1948 novel of the same name by Bernard Victor Dryer (1918–1995). The colour film was directed by Rudolph Maté and the adapted screenplay was written by John Cresswell.

The film was made at Shepperton Studios with sets designed by the art director Wilfred Shingleton. It was filmed on location in the Casbah in Algiers and in Tangiers and Morocco.

Synopsis
Set in July 1945, the film tells the story of a returning American pilot named Rip Reardon who lost his leg during the war and a young woman, Ynez, who is accused of the murder of Rip's wife.

Cast
 Pier Angeli as Ynez 
 Philip Carey as Rip Reardon 
 Dennis Price as Robert Blackton 
 Eugene Deckers a Colonel Moussac 
 James Hayter as Nino 
 Anthony Newley as Pedro 
 Richard Molinas as Captain 
 Christopher Lee as Franz Vermes 
 Guy De Monceau as Police Driver 
 Jacques Cey as Waiter 
 Dorothy White as Berber Girl 
 Denis Shaw as Grila 
 Marie Hanson as Georgette 
 Rachel Gurney as Diane Blackton 
 Guido Lorraine as Abdul 
 André Maranne as Police Officer 
 Lorenza Colville as Bouala 
 Maureen Connell as Native Model 
 Eric Lindsay as Senegalese Boy 
 Auric Lorand as Sentry 
 Larry Taylor as First Arab 
 George Leech as Second Arab 
 Andreas Malandrinos as Gardner 
 Pat O'Meara as Guitarist

References

External links

1956 films
1956 drama films
Films directed by Rudolph Maté
Films scored by Malcolm Arnold
Films set in Tangier
British drama films
Films shot at Shepperton Studios
Columbia Pictures films
1950s English-language films
1950s British films